Marcus Goldbaum (1835–1886) was a Prussian-born American pioneer and prospector in the Arizona Territory.

Early life
Marcus Goldbaum was born in 1835 in Prussia. He immigrated to the United States in the 1850s.

Career
Goldbaum lived in Kansas, Colorado, New Mexico and California in the 1860s. In 1869, he moved to Tucson, Arizona. He served as a Justice of the Peace in Wickenburg, Arizona in 1870. He also lived in Florence, Harshaw, Benson and Tombstone. He then settled down in Tucson, where he worked as a butcher. He also worked as a butcher in Phoenix.

Goldbaum was also a prospector in Southern Arizona, including the Whetstone Mountains.

Personal life and death
Goldbaum was married to Sara Goldbaum. They had seven children, four of which were born in Bavaria and three in Arizona.

Goldbaum was killed by Apache Native Americans in the Whetstone Mountains in 1886.

References

1835 births
1886 deaths
Prussian emigrants to the United States
19th-century German Jews
People from Tucson, Arizona